Sister chromatid cohesion protein PDS5 homolog B (PDS5B) is a protein that in humans is encoded by the PDS5B gene. It is a regulatory subunit of the Cohesin complex which mediates sister chromatid cohesion, homologous recombination and DNA looping. The core cohesin complex is formed of SMC3, SMC1, RAD21 and either SA1 or SA2. PDS5 associates with WAPL to stimulate the release of cohesin from DNA but during DNA replication PDS5 promotes acetylation of SMC3 by ESCO1 and ESCO2.

Model organisms

Model organisms have been used in the study of PDS5B function. A conditional knockout mouse line, called Pds5btm1a(EUCOMM)Wtsi was generated as part of the International Knockout Mouse Consortium program — a high-throughput mutagenesis project to generate and distribute animal models of disease to interested scientists — at the Wellcome Trust Sanger Institute.

Male and female animals underwent a standardized phenotypic screen to determine the effects of deletion. 
Twenty three tests were carried out and two phenotypes were reported. Almost all homozygous mutant animals died prior to birth, and therefore they did not survive until weaning. The remaining tests were carried out on heterozygous mutant mice, and no significant abnormalities were observed.

References

Genes mutated in mice